Francisco Correia Weffort (17 May 1937 – 1 August 2021) was a Brazilian political scientist, academic and politician who served as the Minister of Culture from 1995 until 2002. He was a member of the Workers' Party. He was also a professor at the University of São Paulo.

Weffort was born in 1937 in Quatá, São Paulo. He was educated at the University of São Paulo. Weffort was married to Helena Severo and had four children.

Weffort died on 1 August 2021, at a hospital in Rio de Janeiro, aged 84. He had undergone heart surgery at the time of his death.

References

1937 births
2021 deaths
20th-century Brazilian politicians
Brazilian political scientists
Ministers of Culture of Brazil
Workers' Party (Brazil) politicians
University of São Paulo alumni
People from São Paulo (state)
Academic staff of the University of São Paulo
21st-century Brazilian politicians
21st-century Brazilian educators
20th-century Brazilian educators